Postmen in the Mountains is a 1999 Chinese film directed by Huo Jianqi. It is based on the short story of the same name by Peng Jianming.

Postmen in the Mountains tells the story of an old man (Teng Rujun) who for years served as the postman for rural mountain communities. Retiring, he hands over his job to his son (Liu Ye), but accompanies him on the first tour. Together, they deliver mail on a 230 li (about 115 km) long walking route, into the rural heart of China and in the process the son learns from the mails' recipients more about the father he hardly knew.

It was filmed on location in Suining County and Dao County, in southwestern and southern Hunan. A portion of the film takes place in a village of the Dong people, including an evening festival featuring a lusheng dance.

Plot
The film is set in the mountainous regions of the western Hunan province in the early 1980s.  At the film's start, a young man (Liu Ye) begins his first journey as a postman at the mountainous rural areas of the aforesaid regions.  His father (Teng Rujun), a veteran postman forced to retire due to a bad knee, decides to accompany him together with the family's faithful dog, Buddy.

The father walks his son through the nitty-gritty of the job, and the son realizes the mailman job entails not just the sending of letters.  He witnesses his father's deep friendship with the villagers, and participates in a wedding celebration with the Dong people.  The film includes a number of memory flashbacks, as well as many pop songs played on the son's transistor radio (including Michael Learns to Rock's "That's Why You Go Away", which is an anachronism given that the film is set in the early 1980s).

Reception
Postmen was well received both abroad and at home in China where it won both Best Film and Best Actor (for Teng Rujun) at the Golden Rooster Awards in 1999.

Awards and nominations
Golden Rooster Awards, 1999
Best Actor – Teng Rujun
Best Film
Awards of the Japanese Academy, 2002
Best Foreign Film (nominated)
Mainichi Film Concours, 2002
Best Foreign Language Film
Montréal World Film Festival, 2002
People's Choice Award 	
Grand Prix des Amériques (nominated)

External links

1999 films
Chinese drama films
Films based on short fiction
Films directed by Huo Jianqi
Films set in Hunan
Golden Rooster Best Film recipients
1990s Mandarin-language films
1990s road movies
Films with screenplays by Si Wu